Dustin Miller is a Democratic member of the Louisiana House of Representatives. He has represented District 40 since January 2016.

References

External links
 Dustin Miller at the Louisiana House of Representatives

Living people
Democratic Party members of the Louisiana House of Representatives
Louisiana lawyers
University of Louisiana at Lafayette
21st-century American politicians
Year of birth missing (living people)